Palangabad may refer to:
 Palangabad, Alborz
 Palangabad, Ilam
 Palangabad, Kerman
 Palangabad, Markazi
 Palangabad-e Olya, Mazandaran Province
 Palangabad District, in Alborz Province
 Palangabad Rural District, in Alborz Province